A deferred adjudication, also known in some jurisdictions as an adjournment in contemplation of dismissal (ACOD), probation before judgment (PBJ), or deferred entry of judgment (DEJ), is a form of plea deal available in various jurisdictions, where a defendant pleads "guilty" or "no contest" to criminal charges in exchange for meeting certain requirements laid out by the court within an allotted period of time also ordered by the court. Upon completion of the requirements, which may include probation, treatment, community service, some form of community supervision, or some other diversion program, the defendant may avoid a formal conviction on their record or have their case dismissed.  In some cases, an order of non-disclosure can be obtained, and sometimes a record can be expunged.

Procedure
In a deferred adjudication, the criminal case that resulted in the deferred adjudication will often remain part of a permanent record. The extent to which the record of a deferral can be discovered or disclosed varies by jurisdiction. For example, even if not available to the general public, the record may remain visible to law enforcement and for some government background checks, such as enlistment in the military or employment with a government agency. Some jurisdictions allow for the record to be rendered inaccessible to the public or private-sector background checks.

Anyone offered deferred adjudication in exchange for a guilty plea should first consult their attorney regarding the exact consequences of doing so.

Criminal records after deferred adjudication

In some jurisdictions, defendants who have completed a deferred adjudication for a criminal charge may not be eligible for expungement of their criminal record, such that even though the charge was dismissed there remains a public record of their criminal prosecution. As no conviction was finalized, it may not be possible to remove this criminal record as might have been possible as a result of a pardon or clemency following a criminal conviction. For example, in the U.S. State of Texas, a defendant may obtain an expungement following a deferred disposition for a Class C misdemeanor, but for any other deferred dispositions a defendant must obtain a pardon before the record may be expunged, although some defendants may be able to have their records sealed following a waiting period.

United States

Maryland
In Maryland, deferred adjudication is called probation before judgment (PBJ).  The conditions of this principle are set down in Title §6–220 of the state's Criminal Procedure article.  This law enables a judge to defer entering a judgment (that is, delay the entry of a "guilty" verdict) if the defendant pleads guilty or nolo contendere in writing, so long as certain conditions are met.  Because the judgment is not entered as "guilty," a PBJ does not legally count as a conviction for a crime, and therefore the defendant is spared some hardships of having a criminal record, e.g. for purposes of job applications he or she does not have to disclose it as a conviction, though a full criminal background check will still reveal the case.

The defendant, however, is still placed on probation and can be compelled to pay a monetary fine or other restitution, enroll in a drug rehabilitation program, work  community service hours, and/or less frequently, sentenced to imprisonment or alternative confinement.  If the defendant carries out their sentence and behaves within the conditions of their probation (i.e. commits no further crimes), they become eligible for expungement three years after the judgment or when their probation ends, whichever is later (in some cases they can file early if they can show "good cause" to a judge).  Expungement is not automatically requested; the defendant is responsible for filing for it at court once their time is up.

The statute in Maryland regarding expungement (Md. Ann. Code, Crim. Proc. Art. 10-105(a)(3)) expressly excludes drunk driving charges (Md. Ann. Code, Transportation Article 21-902) where a PBJ is received. DUI charges cannot be expunged.

Maine

In Maine there are two types of deferred adjudications - “Filing Agreement” and “Deferred Disposition” - available to a defendant, but only if there is an agreement between the prosecutor and the defendant or defense counsel to resolve the criminal charges through deferred adjudication.

The first type of deferred adjudication is what is known as a “Filing Agreement”.  Although there is no statutory authority in the Maine Revised Statues for a filing agreement, the basis and requirements for this type of disposition is found in Maine Rule of Criminal Procedure 11B, which reads as follows:

As a practical matter, from the standpoint of a defendant in a criminal matter, a filing agreement is a very favorable means to resolve the case in that it does not require the defendant to enter a guilty plea or admit to conduct.  Furthermore, the conditions on a filing agreement are typically less onerous on a defendant and in the event that the Defendant fails to abide by the conditions of the filing agreement, the State has to move the Court to restore the case back to the docket, which, if granted, affords the Defendant an opportunity to again fight the charges.

The second type of deferred adjudication in Maine is what is known as a “Deferred Disposition”.  Unlike a filing agreement, there is statutory authority under 17-A M.R.S.A. § 1348 et. seq. for a deferred disposition.  Furthermore, unlike a filing agreement, a deferred disposition requires the defendant to enter a plea of guilty in the matter before having the sentence deferred while the deferred disposition agreement is in effect.  In Maine, a deferred disposition is only available for defendants charged with either a class E or D misdemeanor, or a class C felony.  A deferred disposition is not available for juvenile matters or for class A or B felonies.

In general, the requirements of deferred dispositions are controlled by 17-A M.R.S.A. § 1348-A, which reads as follows:

The resolution of a deferred disposition is controlled by 17-A M.R.S.A. § 1348-B, which requires that the Court hold a sentencing hearing wherein the defendant has the burden by showing as a preponderance of the evidence that they have complied with the terms of the deferred disposition agreement.  If the defendant can make such a showing then the Court will follow whichever resolution is contained in the agreement, which is usually to allow the defendant to withdraw their plea and dismiss the matter.  However a dismissal is not guaranteed as the agreement may call for the State to introduce a new lesser charge to which the defendant will enter a plea to and be sentenced as per the terms of the deferred disposition agreement.  If the defendant cannot show by a preponderance of the evidence that they have complied with the deferred disposition agreement, then the Court will proceed to sentence the defendant on the original charge as per the terms of the agreement.   If during the course of the agreement, the prosecutor has probable cause to believe that the defendant is not complying with the deferred disposition agreement or has committed new criminal conduct, the prosecutor may then move the Court to terminate the deferred disposition and impose sentence on the original charge.  The Court will set a hearing on this motion, where the prosecutor must show by a preponderance of the evidence that the defendant failed to comply.

Again as a practical matter from the standpoint of the defendant, a deferred disposition in Maine should be entered into cautiously as the Court as a defendant is required to enter a plea of guilty in order to put the agreement in effect.  The consequence of this is that if the defendant fails to comply with the agreement, they are not afforded the opportunity to fight the charge as with a filing agreement because a plea has already been entered.  Rather, if the Court finds that the defendant failed to meet the terms of the deferred disposition, the Court will impose sentence on the original charge and the conviction will stand.

Texas

In the State of Texas, deferred adjudication is not treated as a criminal conviction as a matter of law; however, there is no easy way to remove the record of the case from one's background.  This creates difficulties with private entities performing background checks such as employers and apartment complexes, as they can see the case, charge and its outcome, and often simply treat it the same as though it were a conviction for purposes of their review. Also, those who fill out an application for a Texas Concealed Handgun License (or any other state license with the exception of a Texas Driver License or state issued ID card) the Deferred Adjudication charge must be disclosed (for CHL applications if the Deferred Adjudication is over 5 years old the individual is eligible to apply but has to disclose their criminal past). To date the State of Texas has passed into law the Order of Nondisclosure where criminal justice agencies (law enforcement, community supervision e.g. probation) are prohibited from disclosing to the public criminal history record information related to the offense for which defendant successfully completed deferred adjudication community supervision. There are limitations where some criminal offenses (from sex offenses, family violence, dating violence) do not allow an Order of Nondisclosure to be filed - felony offenses (in the State of Texas) have a 5-year waiting period, some misdemeanors 2 years, and misdemeanors not listed under the 2-year waiting period can be filed immediately.

Federal Consequences

Immigration
Under U.S. immigration law (pre or post-9/11 which also includes the worded language of the USA Patriot Act) if the defendant is an illegal immigrant charged for a criminal offense, deferred adjudication is considered a conviction where once the sentence is discharged (completed) ICE (Immigration and Customs Enforcement) can have the individual deported from the United States to the country of origin. The same holds true for permanent residents of the United States (resident alien) if moral turpitude is invoked.

Military
It used to be practice for a judge to give a pending convict the option of joining the military, or serving prison time (R. Lee Ermey being one prominent example of this).  However, the U.S. Army, Marine Corps, Air Force, and Coast Guard have since explicitly forbidden entrance in to armed forces as an alternative for judicial punishment, and the U.S. Navy strongly discourages it. The U.S. Armed Forces have required moral waivers for those convicted of crimes to be inducted since the 1960s.  The myth still lives on in legends involving the U.S. military, especially as some servicemen themselves perpetuate it, and it may still in fact be rarely unofficially issued.  However, it is broadly forbidden, and very uncommon in present times.  One such case of the ban's enforcement arose in 2006, where a New York judge gave a man this option in lieu of spending up to a year in jail for aggravated assault. The Army however, rejected his entrance under those terms, having officially banned the option in 1984.

See also
  Adjournment in contemplation of dismissal

References

Pleas
Probation